Hybopsis is a genus of cyprinid fish endemic to the United States. There are currently six described species in this genus.

Species
 Hybopsis amblops (Rafinesque, 1820) (Bigeye chub)
 Hybopsis amnis (C. L. Hubbs & Greene, 1951) (Pallid shiner)
 Hybopsis hypsinotus (Cope, 1870) (Highback chub)
 Hybopsis lineapunctata Clemmer & Suttkus, 1971 (Lined chub)
 Hybopsis rubrifrons (D. S. Jordan, 1877) (Rosyface chub)
 Hybopsis winchelli Girard, 1856 (Clear chub)

References

 

 
Fish of the United States